The 2017–18 Azerbaijan Cup was the 26th season of the annual cup competition in Azerbaijan. The final was played on 28 May 2018.

First round
The first round games were drawn on 6 October 2017.

Second round
The two winners of the first round progressed to the Second round, which was also drawn on 6 October 2017.

Quarter-finals
The eight winners from the second round are drawn into four two-legged ties.

Semi-finals
The four winners from the quarter-finals were drawn into two two-legged ties.

Final

Scorers
4 goals:
 Filip Ozobić

3 goals:

 Bagaliy Dabo
 Mirsahib Abbasov
 Pardis Fardjad-Azad
 Amil Yunanov
 Daniel Segovia

2 goals:

 Javid Huseynov
 Ruslan Qurbanov
 Steeven Joseph-Monrose
 Ilyas Safarzade
 Shahriyar Rahimov
 Rafael Maharramli
 César Meza Colli
 Hugo Bargas
 Pedro Henrique
 Kamal Mirzayev
 Vusal Isgandarli

1 goals:

 Hajiaga Hajiyev
 Ulvi Isgandarov
 Famoussa Koné
 Ekigho Ehiosun
 Kamran Abdullazade
 Adrian Scarlatache
 Vasif Mehraliyev
 Ismayil Ibrahimli
 Garib Ibrahimov
 Lucas Gómez
 Mirabdulla Abbasov
 Namik Alaskarov
 Emin Mahmudov
 Soni Mustivar
 Afran Ismayilov
 Richard
 Aslan Huseynov
 Ayrton Statie
 Alexandru Popovici
 Elman Tagaýew
 Elvin Hasanaliev
 Rashad Eyyubov
 Javid Imamverdiyev
 Elnur Samadov
 Orkhan Aliyev
 David Manga

References

Azerbaijan Cup seasons
Azerbaijan
Cup